House of Councillors elections were held in Japan on July 11, 2010. In the previous elections in 2007 the Liberal Democratic Party (LDP) had lost its majority to the Democratic Party (DPJ), which managed to gain the largest margin since its formation in 1996.  The House of Councillors is elected by halves to six-year terms. The seats up for election in 2010 were last contested in the 2004 election.

Background
On 11 June 2008, a non-binding censure motion was passed by parliament's opposition-controlled House of Councillors against then Prime Minister Yasuo Fukuda. Filed by the DPJ and two other parties, it was the first censure motion against a prime minister under Japan's post-war constitution. Ahead of the G8 summit, it attacked his handling of domestic issues including an unpopular medical plan and called for a snap election or his resignation. On 12 June a motion of confidence was passed by the lower house's ruling coalition to counter the censure. Fukuda abruptly announced he was retiring as leader. Taro Aso won the subsequent election, which was held on 22 September 2008.

In the 2009 lower house election, the DPJ gained an historic majority, being the first non-LDP party to hold a majority in that house since the LDP's formation and is scheduled to lead the second non-LDP government in the aforementioned time period (with upper house allies the Social Democratic Party of Japan and the People's New Party). Following the election, Aso resigned as LDP president. Sadakazu Tanigaki was elected the leader of LDP on September 28, 2009.

The House of Councillors election in 2010 was viewed as potentially leading to the extinction of the LDP. Some of the LDP's most popular councillors, such as Yoichi Masuzoe and Kaoru Yosano, left the party prior to the election. However, the DPJ's popularity had been negatively impacted by fundraising scandals surrounding its president Yukio Hatoyama and secretary general Ichiro Ozawa, both of whom resigned on June 2, 2010. Naoto Kan became prime minister after Hatoyama's resignation and proposed a controversial increase in the consumption tax to shore up Japanese public finances. The campaign season was only three weeks long, which frustrated efforts to have policy debates between the two major parties and the numerous third parties in the election.

Pre-election composition

Results
The result of the election was declared on July 12, 2010. The ruling DPJ lost many of its seats and the opposition LDP gained more seats in comparison to the last election, held in 2007. Your Party performed well in this election, while the DPJ's junior coalition partner, the People's New Party, performed poorly.

DPJ nomination strategy in multi-member districts
DPJ secretary-general Ichirō Ozawa had decided on an offensive strategy for nominating candidates in multi-member districts (MMDs): The DPJ was to nominate two candidates in all MMDs with the exceptions of Niigata where an SDP-affiliated independent incumbent was in the race and Fukuoka where a PNP incumbent sought reelection. This strategy was reaffirmed after Ozawa's resignation in June 2010 even though the DPJ's support rate had significantly fallen by then and winning both seats in a SNTV two-member district requires a very high margin in terms of party votes and an equal distribution of votes on the two candidates.

The strategy failed: all two-member districts split seats evenly between DPJ and LDP in 2010. In some districts the party even risked losing both seats due to vote splitting, a danger that did not materialize in the election result.

The LDP on the other hand nominated only one candidate per MMD – exceptions being Miyagi, Chiba and Tokyo –, thus concentrating all LDP votes on one candidate.

The election results in MMDs gave 20 seats to the DPJ, 18 to the LDP, three to the Kōmeitō and three to Your Party. The only districts where the DPJ won two seats and an advantage in seats over the LDP were Tokyo (5 seats) where administrative reform minister Renhō received a record 1.7 million votes and Toshio Ogawa ranked fourth and DPJ stronghold Aichi (3 seats) where DPJ candidates only finished second and third behind LDP newcomer Masahito Fujikawa.

LDP gains
Part of the LDP victory were the results in the 29 single-member districts where the DPJ received roughly 7 million votes winning eight districts while the LDP received 8.25 million votes and 21 seats, among them seven pickups compared to the pre-election composition of the chamber:
 Aomori, Akita, Tottori and Nagasaki from the DPJ
Kagawa and Tokushima from the NRP, both from former LDP members, and
 Tochigi which had been a two-member district until 2010 with seats held by DPJ and NRP.
The LDP also gained seven additional seats in two-member districts, but exclusively seats it had previously lost by party switchovers or resignations:
 in Hokkaidō from the Sunrise Party,
 in Niigata where Naoki Tanaka had switched parties together with his wife Makiko from an SDP-affiliated independent,
 in Gifu from an ex-LDP independent,
 in Nagano a vacant seat previously held by the LDP,
 in Hiroshima and Fukuoka from the PNP and
 only in Shizuoka directly from the DPJ where the Democrats had held both seats up because of the resignation of Yukiko Sakamoto in 2009 and the DPJ's victory in the resulting by-election.
The vote in the districts with three (Saitama, Chiba, Kanagawa, Aichi, Ōsaka) or five (Tōkyō) seats up went clearly to the DPJ with a 3.5 million vote edge over the LDP, but produced only a two-seat difference in the House of Councillors: the LDP won six, the DPJ eight seats.

If compared to the 2004 election when the same class of Councillors was last elected, the LDP only gained five prefectural district seats and lost three seats in the nationwide proportional representation.

By prefecture
Elected candidates in bold

Notes:
 All incumbents not running for re-election in their prefectural electoral district are counted as retirements even if they ran in the nationwide proportional representation
 Miyagi is counted as an LDP hold because Ichikawa was an LDP member and remained with the LDP parliamentary group up to the election. He ran as an independent after failing to gain the party's official nomination in Miyagi.

Proportional preference vote 

Notable defeated PR candidates included former Tokyo Metropolitan Assemblyman Tarō Hatoyama (NRP, 23,944 votes, rank 2), former Olympic gymnast Yukio Iketani (DPJ, 54,155 votes, rank 27), former Giants manager Tsuneo Horiuchi (LDP, 101,840 votes, rank 13), former Giants infielder Kiyoshi Nakahata (SPJ, 111,597 votes, rank 2) and pro wrestler Osamu Nishimura (PNP, 34,561 votes, rank 3).

References

Japan
2010 elections in Japan
House of Councillors (Japan) elections
July 2010 events in Japan
Election and referendum articles with incomplete results